Rémy Nenet Ebanega Ekwa (born 17 November 1989) is Gabonese former professional footballer who played as a defender.

Club career
Ebanega was born in Bitam, Gabon, 

In April 2015, he sustained a severe knee injury. By February 2017, he had been out of action for almost two years.

International career
Ebanega was called up to Gabon national team and played at the 2012 Africa Cup of Nations and the 2012 Summer Olympics.

President of the ANFPG
Ebanega is the President of the ANFPG (Association Syndicales des Footballers Professionels du Gabon), a trade union in Gabon.

References

External links
 
 

1989 births
Living people
People from Woleu-Ntem Province
Association football defenders
Gabonese footballers
US Bitam players
AJ Auxerre players
CA Bastia players
Gabon international footballers
2012 Africa Cup of Nations players
Olympic footballers of Gabon
Footballers at the 2012 Summer Olympics
Gabonese expatriate footballers
Expatriate footballers in France
Gabonese expatriate sportspeople in France
21st-century Gabonese people
2011 African Nations Championship players
Gabon A' international footballers#